Freedom High School (FHS) is a public high school in Freedom, Outagamie County, Wisconsin, United States. It is part of the Freedom Area School District.

History 
The first public school in Freedom began in 1863 in the home of early settler Nicholas July, and the first high school was built in 1905. That wooden building burned down in 1927 or 1928, and was replaced by a brick building.

With funding from the Works Progress Administration, a gymnasium was added in 1938, and other major additions were built in 1956 and 1972. Since 1972, voters have approved referendums to build more classrooms, a library, and a fieldhouse.

In November 2017, voters rejected a US$66.7 million school referendum to build a new high school. In January 2019, the school district proposed a reduced referendum for a US$55.7 million project, to be on the ballot on April 2, 2019.

Curriculum 
The school district has adopted Common Core State Standards in Language Arts, Disciplinary Literacy, and Math. Next Generation Science Standards are under implementation. According to the Wisconsin Department of Public Instruction, the school earned a four-star overall score, "Exceeds expectations", for "student achievement, student growth, educational equity, and preparing students for educational milestones, including college and career readiness".

Athletics 
Freedom's athletic teams are known as the Irish, and compete in the North Eastern Conference. The Irish have won ten Wisconsin Interscholastic Athletic Association state championships.

References

External links 
 

Schools in Outagamie County, Wisconsin
Public high schools in Wisconsin